Second Commission of the House of Representatives in Indonesia,  more commonly known as the Second Commission, is one of eleven commissions for the 2019-2024 period, within the People's Representative Council. The commission has the scope of tasks in the fields of domestic administration and regional autonomy; state apparatus and bureaucratic reform, elections, land and agrarian Reform.

Legal basis 

 Law of the Republic of Indonesia Number 17 of 2014 concerning the People's Consultative Assembly, the People's Representative Council, the Regional Representative Council, and the Regional People's Representative Council
 Law of the Republic of Indonesia Number 42 of 2014 concerning Amendments to Law Number 17 of 2014 concerning the People's Consultative Assembly, People's Representative Council, Regional Representative Council, and Regional People's Representative Council
 Law of the Republic of Indonesia Number 2 of 2018 concerning the Second Amendment to Law Number 17 of 2014 concerning the People's Consultative Assembly, the People's Representative Council, the Regional Representative Council, and the Regional People's Representative Council
 Regulation of the House of Representatives of the Republic of Indonesia Number 1 of 2014 concerning Rules of Conduct
 Regulation of the House of Representatives of the Republic of Indonesia Number 3 of 2015 concerning Amendments to the Regulation of the House of Representatives of the Republic of Indonesia Number 1 of 2014 concerning Orders.

Scope and duties 
Like other commissions, the First Commission has duties in the fields of:

 Domestic Administration and Regional Autonomy;
 State Apparatus and Bureaucratic Reform;
 Elections;
 Land and Agrarian Reform.

Membership

Composition

Leadership

Members

References 

Commissions of the People's Representative Council